The fifty-sixth edition of the Caribbean Series (Serie del Caribe) was played in . It was held from February 1 through February 8 of 2014 with the champion baseball teams of Cuba, Naranjas de Villa Clara; Dominican Republic, Tigres del Licey; Mexico, Naranjeros de Hermosillo; Puerto Rico, Indios de Mayagüez, and Venezuela, Navegantes del Magallanes. The games were played at Estadio Nueva Esparta in Margarita Island, Porlamar, Venezuela. Unlike previous Series, the five teams competed through a ten-game round robin schedule, each team facing the other teams once, followed by a final four playoff round. This was the first time since 1960 that a Cuban team took part.

Round robin

Schedule
Time zone VET (UTC–4½)

Standings

Linescores

Game 1, February 1

Game 2, February 1

Game 3, February 2

Game 4, February 2

Game 5, February 3

Game 6, February 3

Game 7, February 4

Game 8, February 4

Game 9, February 5

Game 10, February 5

Playoff round

Bracket

Semifinals

Championship game

Linescores

Game 11, February 6

Game 12, February 7

Game 13, February 8

Individual leaders

All-Star team

References

Sources
Official Site
MLB.com – 2014 Caribbean Series

Caribbean
2014
International baseball competitions hosted by Venezuela
2014 in Caribbean sport
Caribbean Series
Porlamar